Tahoe Vista is a census-designated place located on the north shore of Lake Tahoe in Placer County, California.  It is part of the Sacramento–Arden-Arcade–Roseville Metropolitan Statistical Area. The population was 1,433 at the 2010 census, down from 1,668 at the 2000 census.

Geography
Tahoe Vista is located at  (39.246369, -120.048962).

Demographics

2010
At the 2010 census Tahoe Vista had a population of 1,433. The racial makeup of Tahoe Vista was 1,279 (89.3%) White, 3 (0.2%) African American, 8 (0.6%) Native American, 21 (1.5%) Asian, 2 (0.1%) Pacific Islander, 82 (5.7%) from other races, and 38 (2.7%) from two or more races. Hispanic or Latino of any race were 352 people (24.6%).

The whole population lived in households, no one lived in non-institutionalized group quarters and no one was institutionalized.

There were 628 households, 148 (23.6%) had children under the age of 18 living in them, 291 (46.3%) were opposite-sex married couples living together, 33 (5.3%) had a female householder with no husband present, 24 (3.8%) had a male householder with no wife present.  There were 47 (7.5%) unmarried opposite-sex partnerships, and 7 (1.1%) same-sex married couples or partnerships. 207 households (33.0%) were one person and 38 (6.1%) had someone living alone who was 65 or older. The average household size was 2.28.  There were 348 families (55.4% of households); the average family size was 2.93.

The age distribution was 262 people (18.3%) under the age of 18, 122 people (8.5%) aged 18 to 24, 425 people (29.7%) aged 25 to 44, 487 people (34.0%) aged 45 to 64, and 137 people (9.6%) who were 65 or older.  The median age was 40.4 years. For every 100 females, there were 113.6 males.  For every 100 females age 18 and over, there were 115.3 males.

There were 1,446 housing units at an average density of 532.5 per square mile, of the occupied units 398 (63.4%) were owner-occupied and 230 (36.6%) were rented. The homeowner vacancy rate was 4.9%; the rental vacancy rate was 14.4%.  961 people (67.1% of the population) lived in owner-occupied housing units and 472 people (32.9%) lived in rental housing units.

2000
At the 2000 census there were 1,668 people, 670 households, and 402 families in the CDP. The racial makeup of the CDP was 86.87% White, 0.12% African American, 0.48% Native American, 1.20% Asian, 7.97% from other races, and 3.36% from two or more races. Hispanic or Latino of any race were 17.81%.

Of the 670 households 28.7% had children under the age of 18 living with them, 49.0% were married couples living together, 5.2% had a female householder with no husband present, and 39.9% were non-families. 26.7% of households were one person and 2.5% were one person aged 65 or older.  The average household size was 2.49 and the average family size was 3.00.

The age distribution was 21.4% under the age of 18, 10.2% from 18 to 24, 35.5% from 25 to 44, 27.2% from 45 to 64, and 5.8% 65 or older.  The median age was 36 years. For every 100 females, there were 110.1 males.  For every 100 females age 18 and over, there were 113.5 males.

The median household income was $51,958 and the median family income  was $63,125. Males had a median income of $35,764 versus $29,250 for females. The per capita income for the CDP was $24,170.  About 5.8% of families and 8.1% of the population were below the poverty line, including 13.6% of those under age 18 and none of those age 65 or over.

References

External links
 

Census-designated places in Placer County, California
Lake Tahoe
Populated places in the Sierra Nevada (United States)
Census-designated places in California